"Sugar Crash!" (stylized as "SugarCrash!") is a song written, produced, and performed by Canadian musician ElyOtto. It was released on August 25, 2020. A remix featuring Kim Petras and Curtis Waters was released on April 23, 2021.

Background and composition
At one minute and 20 seconds long, the song is in the key of F major with a tempo of 98 beats per minute. It went viral on the video-sharing app TikTok in 2021. "SugarCrash!" incorporates hyperpop with many sound effects, distorted bass, and high-pitched vocals, consisting of two choruses, a verse, and a bridge. Platt claimed in a Genius interview that the song, made with GarageBand, was a soundfont test for Pokémon Black and White. Platt also stated that the song covered many of his issues; how tired he was of the ongoing COVID-19 pandemic, his future, and his gender dysphoria.

Reception
Vulture's  Justin Curto wrote: "As a song, 'SugarCrash!' tries to solve the very problem it's about. It's nothing new in hyperpop, which often uses buoyant productions to address darker themes. But on another, equally self-aware level, the song works so well because it's also about exactly what it sounds like. It's a hyperactive song about being full of pent-up energy; a brain-splitting song that, at one point, contemplates splitting one's own brain". The song also received praise from Billboard author Joe Lynch, who described it as "a diaristic, candy-coated slice of teenage dissatisfaction." 

Following the song's success, at least seven record labels reached out to ElyOtto before he signed to RCA Records.

Chart performance
The song debuted at number 30 on the Hot Rock & Alternative Songs chart, having spent 19 weeks-and-counting on the chart in total, peaking at number 10. It later debuted at number 23 on the Bubbling Under Hot 100 for the week of March 20, 2021, and peaked at number 59 on the UK Singles Chart, as well as number 126 on Billboards Global 200. The song also earned ElyOtto a spot on Rolling Stones Breakthrough 25 chart for the months of February and March 2021 at numbers 15 and 17, respectively, as well as a spot on Billboards Emerging Artists chart for four weeks, peaking at number 36.

Music video
On April 23, 2021, a visualizer was released along with the remix. A music video for the original song was released on May 4, 2021. Both videos sit at a combined 23.5 million views as of September 2022.

Charts

Weekly charts

Year-end charts

Certifications

References

2021 songs
2021 singles
Transgender-related songs
Hyperpop songs
Songs about the COVID-19 pandemic